The Marrow of a Bone (stylized THE MARROW OF A BONE) is the sixth studio album by Japanese heavy metal band Dir En Grey.

It was released on February 7, 2007, in Japan, and in the United States (20 February), Germany (2 March), France (6 March), and the United Kingdom (7 May) in the following months. In total, the album was released in eleven countries.

The band was touring North America at the time of the album's release in both Japan and the United States. In March 2007, The Marrow of a Bone reached number 21 on Billboard's "Top Independent Albums" chart.

The album was released in Japan with two editions. The regular edition is a single disc packaged in a traditional jewel case, and a limited edition was released with two discs, one being the main album, and the second an "unplugged" album. The European and American releases were all single editions.

The main disc with the thirteen featured tracks were included. The initial pressing of the album's American edition was affected by a misprint. Warcon Records announced that corrected booklets would be printed, however, specific details have yet to be released. Later pressings featured a correctly printed booklet with a fully visible logo.  The cover image is taken from the Dmitri Baltermants photograph "Grief".

A promotional site, in both Japanese and English, was launched prior to the album's release, containing video clips and samples of several songs, information about the album, hosted on the band's official web page. A second promotional site was launched shortly after the release, only accessible with a password included in the Japanese release. Both sites posted information about "premium live" shows, available to those who purchased the album and registered with their product barcode. Footage from the first show was featured on the fan club DVD, In Weal or Woe.

Production 
The Marrow of a Bone is, like most other Dir En Grey albums, self-produced. Work began on the album as early as 2005, while the majority of songs were written while touring throughout 2006 between shows in Japan, Europe, and America during the Family Values Tour. The band members noted that touring in the United States on a major festival tour influenced and inspired them in the production process, and several songs, including "Lie Buried with a Vengeance", "Agitated Screams of Maggots", and "The Pledge". Guitarist Kaoru has said about the production process, "...some of it went really well, but some of it went really badly." The entirety of the album's final recording was completed following their 2006 tour in December, with only the month of January to finalize production to meet the February release date. Even though the formal process was rapid, it has been described as their cleanest production and heaviest album to date. The production on the supporting singles and the album showed a noted difference, with two of the singles, "Ryōjoku no Ame" and "Clever Sleazoid", being rerecorded entirely for the album, as Dir En Grey hired a new sound engineer. "Ryōjoku no Ame" received a strong change instrumentally, as well as removing the falsetto vocals.

As with every Dir En Grey album following Vulgar (2003), the lyrics are solely composed by Kyo, and all music is credited to Dir En Grey wholly, while the online liner notes give some insight into individual writing of songs, such as drummer, Shinya's writing of "Namamekashiki Ansoku, Tamerai ni Hohoemi".

Style 
The entire album is a progression for Dir En Grey into heavier sounds, felt in the previous album, Withering to Death. Individually, the album's songs vary from soft and slow-tempoed, to chunky and aggressive, however the sound on the album always remains dark and emotional.

The album opens with a moody, slow-tempoed power ballad, "Conceived Sorrow", but the contrast is immediate with the second track, "Lie Buried with a Vengeance" displaying "thrashy drumming, callous riffing, and barked vocals". The album continues at a heavier, faster pace with "The Fatal Believer", "Agitated Screams of Maggots", and "Grief". "Agitated Screams of Maggots" is the pinnacle of the album's "straightforward bashing metal". The album steps down in heaviness as "Ryōjoku no Ame" is a "near-symphonic progressive metal tune." Following is "Disabled Complexes", a song that "contains a lot of funk elements" but it quickly goes "into a different dimension in the middle of the song." Showing a completely different sound, "Namamekashiki Ansoku, Tamerai ni Hohoemi" is a deviation from the heavier, loud sound enduring from the second track, and seen as the softest of the feature tracks. The guitar work has a "Spanish-like", melodramatic sound, with a very emotional expression showing "the band's maturity as songwriters,"

The album's final progression to its heavier sounds begins with "The Pledge", which for Kyo, uses his full vocal range. "Repetition of Hatred" is another heavy track to the album, which gives a strong example of the backing vocal aspect, performed by Kaoru, Toshiya and Die, the latter who commented "It's tough sometimes when you have to sing and play your guitar at the same time. Kyo [the lyricist] doesn't think about how difficult it can be."

Music videos 
The first music video released was for "Clever Sleazoid" in 2005 with the single version of the song, however the new recording is featured in the live-footage music video found on Despair in the Womb. After a year of touring, the next single, "Ryōjoku no Ame" was released, also featuring a music video. The third single from the album, "Agitated Screams of Maggots", is another song with two music videos. The first music video for the song was an animated video created by Keita Kurosaka, which was shown at the 2007 International Film Festival Rotterdam. The original video aired only as a censored clip on Japanese television, due to its "sick and twisted" nature. A second music video for the song appears on Despair in the Womb, compiled of live footage of their 2006 touring.

"Grief" is the only track on the album to be turned into a music video without being released as a single. The video was released just prior to the album as a promotional clip.

Touring 

Dir En Grey supported The Marrow of a Bone with touring throughout 2006 and all of 2007. In 2006, Dir En Grey began their "Tour 06 Inward Scream" shows, with the debut show in August. The show featured several teaser tracks, making this the debut performance of "Conceived Sorrow", "Agitated Screams of Maggots", "Disabled Complexes", and "The Deeper Vileness". After featuring these teaser tracks in the later 2006 touring, the band started regularly rotating several new songs during the American tour, beginning in 2007. The album was released while Dir En Grey was on tour in the United States, however the band was not yet fully supporting the album.

In March, the band began "Tour 07 The Marrow of a Bone", thoroughly covering much of Japan and ending in the beginning of May. This tour introduced set-lists containing most of the tracks from The Marrow of a Bone, and was the first time many of the songs had been performed publicly. After the first leg of "The Marrow of a Bone" touring, Dir En Grey went on to another American tour, opening for Deftones in June and July. The short set-lists, due to their opening position, usually consisted of new material, giving the first performances of several songs in the United States.

Following American touring, "Tour 07 The Marrow of a Bone" continued, now in its European stage. The European tour, still supporting the album, including several festival appearances, brought Dir En Grey through the United Kingdom, Sweden, Denmark, Germany, Finland, and Poland. Upon returning to Japan, the band recorded and released a new single, "Dozing Green", and had a short tour supporting the new single, as well as the previous album. The "Dozing Green" tour also contained a short European leg, supporting the same material. "The Marrow of a Bone" tour concluded with a short Japan tour in December 2007, also featuring American band 10 Years as a support act. The finale took place with three consecutive shows at Shinkiba Studio Coast in Tokyo.

Reception 

The album has received critical acclaim from music critics. Reviews by Apeshit, Billboard.com and About.com described it as Dir En Grey's best album to date, and a definite progression from their last effort, Withering to Death, which was also met by underground critical acclaim.

The album reached the second spot on CDJapan 2007 sales charts. The album charted on the Billboard "Top Heatseekers" chart at number 8, the "Top Independent Albums" at number 21, and again on the Oricon album charts at number 30.

Track listing

Notes
"The Deeper Vileness" was re-recorded and released on the second disc for the limited editions of their 2018 album The Insulated World.
"Clever Sleazoid" was re-recorded and released as a b-side of the band's  single in 2020.

Release history

Personnel 

 Dir En Grey – producer
 Kyo – vocals, lyricist
 Kaoru – guitar, composer, programming
 Die – guitar, composer
 Toshiya – bass guitar, composer
 Shinya – drums, composer

 Yasushi "Koni-Young" Konishi – recording, mixing
 Akinori Kaizaki – recording, mixing
 Kazushige Yamazaki – mastering
 Dynamite Tommy – executive producer
 Koji Yoda – art direction
 Tadasuke – piano (on disc two)
 Yoshinori Abe - programming

References

External links 
The Marrow of a Bone liner notes at Direngrey.co.jp
The Marrow of a Bone (disc 2) at MusicBrainz

2007 albums
Dir En Grey albums